The 1953–54 season of the Quaid-i-Azam Trophy was the first edition of the tournament, and the inaugural first-class cricket competition played in Pakistan following its independence in 1947. One of the tournament's purposes was to help determine the Pakistan national side's squad for its tour of England in 1954.

The tournament was played as a knockout competition between seven teams representing both regions and government departments. Punjab received a bye through to the semi-finals to compensate for the odd number of teams. The final, played in Karachi, was contested between Punjab and Bahawalpur, with Bahawalpur winning by eight wickets. Two Bahawalpur players, Hanif Mohammad and Fazal Mahmood (both future Pakistan captains), led the competition in runs and wickets, respectively.

Teams
Five teams (Bahawalpur, Combined Services, Karachi, North-West Frontier Province, and Railways) made their first-class debuts in the tournament.

Results

Source:

Preliminary round

Semi-finals

Final

Statistics

Most runs
The top five runscorers are included in this table, listed by runs scored and then by batting average.

Most wickets

The top five wicket-takers are listed in this table, listed by wickets taken and then by bowling average.

References

Domestic cricket competitions in 1953–54
1953 in Pakistani cricket
1954 in Pakistani cricket
1953-54 Quaid-e-Azam Trophy